Dichocrocis macrostidza is a species of moth of the family Crambidae. It was described by George Hampson in 1912 and it is known from Myanmar.

It is bright ochreous yellow and both wings are covered with large black spots. It has a wingspan of 30 mm.

References
Hampson (1912). "The moths of India. Supplementary paper to the volumes in The Fauna of British India. Series IV. Part V (?VI)". Journal of the Bombay Natural History Society. 21 (4): 1222-1272.

Spilomelinae
Moths described in 1912